A Duma (plural dumy) is a sung epic poem which originated in Ukraine during the Hetmanate Era in the Sixteenth century (possibly based on earlier Kyivan epic forms). Historically, dumy were performed by itinerant Cossack bards called kobzari, who accompanied themselves on a kobza or a torban, but after the abolition of Hetmanate by the Empress Catherine of Russia the epic singing became the domain of blind itinerant musicians who retained the kobzar appellation and accompanied their singing by playing a bandura (rarely a kobza) or a relya/lira (a Ukrainian variety of hurdy-gurdy). Dumas are sung in recitative, in the so-called "duma mode", a variety of the Dorian mode with a raised fourth degree.

Dumy were songs built around historical events, many dealing with the military actions in some forms.  Embedded in these historical events were religious and moralistic elements. There are themes of the struggle of the Cossacks against enemies of different faiths or events occurring on religious feast-days. Although the narratives of the dumy mainly revolve around war – the dumy themselves do not promote courage in battle. The dumy imparts a moral message in which one should conduct oneself properly in the relationships with the family, the community, and the church. However, the kobzari did not play only religious songs and dumy.  They also played “satirical songs (sometimes openly scabrous); dance melodies; either with or without words; lyric songs; and historical songs”.

The origin

The relationship between the military and the religion with dumy originated in the Cossack rebellion of 1648.  Ukraine fell under the control of the Catholic Polish-Lithuanian Commonwealth, that imposed discriminatory measures on the Eastern Orthodox Church. This rebellion was followed by “partition and eventual subjugation of the Ukrainian lands and the Ukrainian church. The Cossacks rebelled against the religious oppression and their lands were eventually lost to the oppressor.  This causes a great dilemma in the church because the Cossacks were defenders of the faith, and since they lost, and the faith is infallible, the Cossacks themselves must have done something sinful. This is why dumy has a great religious undertone and is a song that tells of death and defeat, not of victory.

Textual characteristic 
Duma, as an epic, in comparison to other epic forms does not contain elements of fantasy.

Linguistic characteristics 
The dominant element of dumy is language. Rhythm is rhetorical, often falling on a verb placed at the end. The use of parallelisms is widespread, epithets are standard, the use of specific numbers is also widespread. The use of archaic forms of language is also popular as is the use of retardation.

Musical characteristics

Melodic characteristics 

The melodies of dumy consist of
 repetitive recitative-like passages on one note, changing to a different tone with a lingual accent, usually stepwise and occasionally by a 4th
 melodic recitative-like with falling scalic passages
 melodic closed and semi-closed cadences with characteristic melisma
 a zaplachka based on the word "hey" often very ornate with many melismatic features paralleling the stylistic features of the melody.
 a slavnoslovia (verbal glorification) at the end of the piece. A summation of the work which in some regions is spoken rather than sung.

Almost all traditional dumy from the Poltava and Slobozhan traditions use a Dorian mode with occasionally raised 4th degrees and subseptatonium. The raised 4th often is used as a secondary leading note to the dominant. The appearance of the augmented 2nd between the 3rd and 4th degrees gives the duma an Eastern-sounding flavour and is used by the performer to add "zhal'" (pity) to the work.

Accompaniment 
Dumy are traditionally sung to an instrumental accompaniment, usually that of a bandura, kobza or lira.

In the Slobozhan tradition, the bandura would play most of the notes of the melody with the voice apart from chromatic accidentals and melisma with occasional chords on I, IV, and V degrees of the Dorian mode. The instrument would also be used for instrumental preludes, interludes, and postludes.

In the Poltava tradition, the instrumental accompaniment is much sparser with the player not playing the melody but rather occasional chords based on the tonic and dominant of the Dorian.

In lira accompaniment from Poltava, no melodies are played with the voice during the performance of the duma. Melodic instrumental playing is confined to preludes, interludes, and postludes.

No transcriptions or recordings of authentic duma performance by members of the Chernihiv tradition have come down to us.

Discussion regarding other traditions of duma recitations has shown a significant amount of contamination in the 20th century from non-traditional sources which has rendered many of their recordings atypical and unauthentic according to the traditional style in which the kobzari performed dumy.

See also
Preservation of kobzar music

References 

Clegg, D. “Philaret Kolessa’s Classification of the Ukrainian Recitative Songs” Studia
Musicologica Academiae Scientiarum Hungaricae  7 (1965): 247–251.
Kononenko, Natalie O. “The Influence of the Orthodox Church on Ukrainian Dumy.”
Slavic Review 50 (1991): 566–575.

External links 
 Duma at the Encyclopedia of Ukraine.

Epic poetry
Kobzarstvo
Ukrainian literature
Ukrainian music
Oral literature